The 1937 Missouri Tigers football team was an American football team that represented the University of Missouri in the Big Six Conference (Big 6) during the 1937 college football season. The team compiled a 3–6–1 record (2–2–1 against Big 6 opponents), finished in fourth place in the Big 6, and was outscored by all opponents by a combined total of 64 to 42. Don Faurot was the head coach for the third of 19 seasons. The team played its home games at Memorial Stadium in Columbia, Missouri.

The team's leading scorer was Henry Mahle with eight points.

Schedule

References

Missouri
Missouri Tigers football seasons
Missouri Tigers football